Pynes Town District is one of 16 districts of Sinoe County, Liberia. As of 2008, it had a population of 4,167.

References

Districts of Liberia
Sinoe County